The Sea Control Ship (SCS) was a small aircraft carrier developed and conceptualized by the United States Navy under Chief of Naval Operations Elmo Zumwalt during the 1970s. Currently the term refers to naval vessels that can perform similar duties. The SCS was intended as an escort vessel, providing air support for convoys. It was canceled after budgetary cuts to the US Navy.

The SCS was to be equipped with a mix of Rockwell XFV-12 fighter aircraft and anti-submarine warfare helicopters. It was tasked with carrying out anti-submarine warfare operations.

Concept
In the late 1960s, studies by US Navy identified a potential requirement for large scale convoy operations in the event of a war with the Soviet Union. In order to compensate for a shortage of escort ships, it was suggested that helicopters operating from small helicopter carriers could fill the gap. When Elmo Zumwalt became Chief of Naval Operations in 1970, he seized on the idea of small helicopter carriers as part of his "High-Low" plan in which large numbers of cheaper lower capability ships would be built to supplement existing expensive high capability ships. The proposed small carrier, which was named the Sea Control Ship (SCS), was required to provide continuous airborne cover of two anti-submarine and one airborne early warning helicopters, as well as carrying VSTOL fighters to stop Soviet long-range aircraft (like the Tupolev Tu-95 "Bear") from shadowing convoys and directing submarines and surface ships against them. This resulted in a requirement to carry 14 helicopters and three VSTOL fighters such as the AV-8 Harrier. It was hoped that production SCSs could be built for $100 million each, an eighth of the price of a full sized aircraft carrier.

Weaponry was to be limited, consisting of two Phalanx Close-in weapon systems to defend against anti-ship missiles.

Experimental Sea Control Ship
In 1971  was chosen as a test vessel. Testing began on 18 January 1972. In 1974 she was deployed to the Atlantic Ocean. The vessel was equipped with AV-8A Harrier STOVL fighters and SH-3 Sea King ASW helicopters. The tests were completed in July 1974; USS Guam resumed its role as an amphibious assault ship.

Related ships

The SCSs were smaller than most fleet aircraft carriers, and the concept was seized upon by nations wanting inexpensive aircraft carriers. Spain's , and her smaller cousin ship, Thailand's , were based on the final US Navy blueprints for a dedicated sea control ship, but with the addition of a ski-jump ramp and follow a similar mission profile.

See also
 VSTOL Support Ship
 Aircraft Carrier (Medium)
 SS Atlantic Causeway
 
 
 
 
 Helicopter carrier
 Anti-submarine warfare carrier

References

Notes

Further reading

External links
 Sea Control Ship – GlobalSecurity.org

Ship types
Amphibious warfare vessels
Cold War aircraft carriers of the United States
Proposed aircraft carriers
Cancelled ships of the United States Navy
Aircraft carriers of the United States Navy